Siraj (Malayalam: സിറാജ് ദിനപത്രം, Arabic: جريدة السراج اليومية), a daily newspaper in Malayalam language, It was established in 1984. The newspaper belongs to Thoufeeque Publications. It is publishing from five cities in India Kozhikode, Thiruvananthapuram, Kochi, Kannur and Bengaluru. In gulf Dubai, Oman and Qatar. The head office of the newspaper is located at Kozhikode. The Editor-in-Chief is V.P.M. Faizy Villiappaly. It has eight editions. The Malappuram edition will start soon.

See also
List of Malayalam-language newspapers
List of Malayalam-language periodicals
List of newspapers in India

References

Daily newspapers published in India
Malayalam-language newspapers
1984 establishments in Kerala
Publications established in 1984
Mass media in Kerala
Samastha (AP Faction)